AccessBank is a bank with headquarters in Baku, Azerbaijan.

History
The bank was founded on 29 October 2002 as the Micro Finance Bank of Azerbaijan by Black Sea Trade & Development Bank, European Bank for Reconstruction and Development, International Finance Corporation, KfW and LFS Financial Systems sharing 20 percent of the equity each.

In 2003, the bank received its first refinancing loan from the EBRD in the amount of USD 5 mln. The current accounts and the money transfer system were launched in 2004. In 2005, the term deposit launched and the bank joins the international SWIFT, Western Union and Privat Money money transfer networks. Moreover, it receives the first non-shareholder refinancing loans from Global Microfinance Facility, Blue Orchard, Deutsche Bank, Incofin, and Triodos. At the same year it opens the first regional branch in Ganja. In 2007, AccessHolding joins as a new shareholder and owns 16.53 percent of the equity decreasing LFS Financial Systems' shares to 3.47 percent.

Sports sponsorship
Since 2010, AccessBank is a lead sponsor of the AFFA.

See also

 Azerbaijani manat
 Banking in Azerbaijan
 Central Bank of Azerbaijan
 Economy of Azerbaijan
 List of banks in Azerbaijan

References

Government of Azerbaijan
Economy of Azerbaijan
Banks of Azerbaijan
Banks established in 2002
2002 establishments in Azerbaijan